"Chains" is a rhythm and blues song written by husband-and-wife songwriting team Gerry Goffin and Carole King. It was a hit for the American girl group the Cookies in 1962 and for the English rock band the Beatles, who recorded the song for their debut album in 1963. King recorded a solo version of "Chains" for her 1980 album Pearls: Songs of Goffin and King.

The Cookies’ version was used as opening sequence of Skipped Parts.

The Cookies rendition 
The song was originally offered to The Everly Brothers who recorded their version in July 1962, but opted not to release it.
The Cookies, who also worked as backing singers, recorded "Chains" and in late 1962, it became their first appearance in the record charts since "In Paradise" reached number nine in 1956. The single released by Dimension Records peaked at number six on Billboard's Hot R&B singles, number 17 on the Hot 100 charts, and number 4 in Canada.

In a song review for AllMusic, critic Richie Unterberger described it as: 

Personnel
Earl-Jean – lead vocals
Margaret Ross – backing vocals
Dorothy Jones – backing vocals
Eva Boyd – backing vocals

The Beatles' version

The single by the Cookies was a popular cover song for Liverpool bands after its release in November 1962, and was included briefly in the Beatles' live sets. They recorded it on February 11, 1963 in four takes, the first proving to be the best. Lennon played the introduction on harmonica.

George Harrison sings the lead vocal on the Beatles' version and, as the fourth track from the group's first album, it represents the first time many fans heard Harrison singing lead on a commercially released song.

They played the song live on a number of BBC radio shows, including Side by Side, Here We Go and Pop Go the Beatles. Though none of those performances were included on the 1994 compilation Live at the BBC, it was eventually released on the 2013 compilation On Air – Live at the BBC Volume 2.

Personnel (from MacDonald)
George Harrison – lead vocals, lead guitar
John Lennon – rhythm guitar, harmonica, harmony vocals
Paul McCartney – bass, harmony vocals
Ringo Starr – drums
Norman Smithengineering

Notes

References
 
 

1962 singles
Song recordings produced by George Martin
Songs with lyrics by Gerry Goffin
The Beatles songs
Songs written by Carole King
1962 songs
Dimension Records singles
The Cookies songs